The following is a list of clock towers in Turkey.

The clock tower tradition first started in the 13th century Europe, and spread to the territory of the Ottoman Empire in the late 16th century and the first clock tower found today in Turkey was erected in 1797 in the Anatolian town of Safranbolu. Starting from the time of Mehmed the Conqueror, the Ottoman high class had used mechanical clocks, but the concept of a clock tower in the Ottoman Empire and the Anatolian region was introduced to the public much later compared to some countries in Europe, about which numerous comments and theories have been offered. While Abdülhak Adnan Adıvar attributes this to the concern that müezzins and timekeepers would have lost their importance, Bernard Lewis argues that the clock, like the printing press, might have caused cracks in the Islamic social fabric. Şule Gürbüz states that mechanical clocks do not necessarily show the correct time sometimes and the clock towers did not become widespread due to this error margin, as the timekeepers could calculate the time for prayer precisely. Numerous clock towers were built with the edicts published on Abdul Hamid II's 25th anniversary of ascension to  the throne, and these edicts are considered an important threshold for the spread of the clock towers. Before Abdul Hamid II's reign, Ziya Pasha built many such towers during his governorship in Adana and Amasya.

The clock towers, which represented the central authority, were built in the center of the cities in which they were located, as in the examples of Antalya Clock Tower and İzmit Clock Tower. Bilecik Clock Tower, Bolu Clock Tower, Göynük Clock Tower, Kastamonu Clock Tower, Mudurnu Clock Tower, Sivrihisar Clock Tower, Bursa Tophane Clock Tower and Istanbul Tophane Clock Tower are built in a location or hillside overlooking the city. There are also clock towers, which are part of a building such as the Şişli Etfal Hospital Clock Tower, as well as those located within a complex, such as the Yıldız Clock Tower. In addition, Ali Çetinkaya Station Clock Tower, Alsancak Station Clock Tower, Ayvalık Clock Tower, Bergama Clock Tower, Gümüşhacıköy Clock Tower, Mersin Clock Tower, Merzifon American College Clock Tower, Sivas Gendarme Barracks Clock Tower, Şirinyer American College Clock Tower and Diyarbakır Hamidiye Clock Fountain are among the towers made to be compatible with the structure in which they are placed. Niğde Clock Tower, Sinop Clock Tower and Zile Clock Tower are examples of clock towers rising above historical castles. Hacı Pasha Clock Tower, which was created by adding a clock to an old factory chimney, and Tepsi Minaret, which was created by adding a clock to a minaret, are among the towers that were later turned into a clock tower. In addition, Çiçek Pasajı Front Clock, Galatasaray High School Roof Clock, Haydarpaşa Station Roof Clock and Sainte-Pulchérie French High School Roof Clock, which do not have a tower structure but are located at a high point of the building, are also usually included in the category of clock towers.

Most clock towers are made of stone, but there are also wooden towers such as Gerede Clock Tower and Mudurnu Clock Tower. Although some towers such as Dolmabahçe Clock Tower, Istanbul University Clock Towers and İzmir Clock Tower are important works with their own aesthetic appearance, most clock towers are structures that are in harmony with their surroundings despite being high or showy and built in accordance with the general characteristics of Islamic architecture.

In functional terms, besides showing the time, there are clock towers used as watchtowers like Samsun Clock Tower, as well as clock towers equipped with barometers and thermometers, as in the case of Dolmabahçe Clock Tower. Kayseri Clock Tower, Muğla Clock Tower, and Tokat Clock Tower are also used as temporary timekeeping locations for religious purposes, while many clock towers such as Çanakkale Clock Tower have a fountain on the base. Göynük Clock Tower, Manisa Clock Tower and Tepsi Minaret operate only with the alarm system without a dial.

Although there are many clock towers today, the number of towers that have had a remarkable quality is one hundred and twenty six. The city with the most clock towers is Istanbul with twenty towers, followed by İzmir with seven towers. As for the region, the Central Anatolia Region is the region with the highest number of clock towers. Twenty-three out of a hundred and twenty six towers are not standing today. Out of the demolished ones, eleven new clock towers were erected at the same spot of their original predecessors, and four were moved to a different spot or reconstructed at a different spot.

Architecture and mechanism of clock towers in Turkey 
Clock towers dated to the 19th century and the beginning of the 20th century and the newer clock towers made based on these examples generally consist of pedestal, trunk and mansion sections. There is a room in the base section and a staircase leading up to the trunk, a "Z" shaped or spiral staircase in the trunk, and a clock machine in the upper section.

There is a small clock on the machine and this clock is connected up with a shaft. The shaft that provides the movement of the hour and minute hands on the dial also activates the clapper of the bell, if any exists. The weights, which are wound on the two rollers between the wheels of the machine and located at the ends of the two steel ropes, go up and down to ensure that the clock is set up and works properly. While the rope attached to the first reel enables the clock to work, the rope and weight attached to the second reel enables the rammer to hit the bell. The bell on the top of the mansion is covered with a dome or a cone and there are openings around the bell so that the sound reaches far.

The clocks are produced to ring based on the numerical number of each hour, although some just ring once regardless of what hour it is. Some clocks also ring every 30 minutes. Others ring twice at the start of each hour, with the ringings being one to two minutes apart. In order for them to continue working properly, clocks are checked every fifteen days or once a month depending on their features.

The timing system for the clock towers, which was set according to the adhan hours, was changed to show the normal timing system with the Law on 24-Hour Division of the Day issued in 1925. With the Law on the Use of International Numbers in 1928, the clocks expressed in Eastern Arabic numerals on the dials were replaced to show Arabic and Roman numerals, and in some cases both the old and new numerals were used on the dials.

Key

List

Notes

References 
Inline citations

Sources

Clock towers in Turkey
Clock towers
Turkey